The Venezuelan Education-Action Program on Human Rights or PROVEA is one of the most prominent Venezuelan human rights organizations. According to the United Nations Human Rights Council, PROVEA "is an independent and autonomous non- governmental organization, which aims to promote and defend human rights, particularly economic, social and cultural rights".

History

Reception
In a 1993 work published by Human Rights Watch titled Human Rights in Venezuela, PROVEA was recognized for creating "training programs for human rights activists throughout the country".

In 2010 PROVEA was awarded the John Humphrey Freedom Award.

President Hugo Chávez stated that "PROVEA is an institution that I know, with which we share the defense of human rights, they are in favor of our rights and our families". José Miguel Vivanco, the Director of Human Rights Watch in the Americas said that "PROVEA is one of the most prestigious organizations in the region. It is an honor for us to work together with them".

See also 

 Foro Penal
 Un Mundo Sin Mordaza
 Venezuelan Observatory of Social Conflict

References

External links
Official website

Organizations established in 1988
Human rights organizations based in Venezuela
2014 Venezuelan protests
2017 Venezuelan protests